Yuanchang Township is a rural township in Yunlin County, Taiwan.

Names
The Yuanchang came from a person named Fu Yuan-chang (傅元掌). He taught his clan people to farm the land, to set the path for water and to build their houses here. He was passionate, generous and loved to help people. Therefore, the people named this township by his name to honor him. The Yuanchang name was known from that time and was widely used.

Geography
It has a population total of 23,656 and an area of

Administrative divisions
Zhangnan, Zhangbei, Zimao, Houhu, Shannei, Gehe, Wukuai, Tanxi, Tantung, Kecuo, Zhuoyun, Dingliao, Xialiao, Longyan, Xizhuang, Lubei, Lunan, Wayao, Neiliao, Lunzi and Xinji Village.

Tourist attractions
 Ao Feng Kung
 Cooperation Irrigation Project
 San-nei Lee House
 Mr. Fu Graveyard
 Tasi Graveyard
 Hou-Jiang-Yen Denomination

Notable natives
 Jacklyn Wu, actress and singer
 Tsai Pi-chung, acting Magistrate of Hualien County (2018)

References

External links

 Yuanchang Government website 

Townships in Yunlin County